Karen Wingyan Kwan Oppegard (born 1 June 1978) is an American retired figure skater and choreographer. She is the older sister of Michelle Kwan.

Early life and skating career 
Karen Kwan was born in Torrance, California.

The Kwan sisters began figure skating at the same time and trained and competed against each other for years. Karen, like Michelle, was coached by Frank Carroll at the Lake Arrowhead training center. Though Karen's results never quite matched Michelle's, she was known for her long legs and arms that added a lyrical style and an elegant dimension to her skating. She also had consistent triple jumps and good technical spins. Karen also represented the United States at numerous international skating events, and won the bronze medal at the 1996 Nebelhorn Trophy in Germany. She retired in 1997 to focus on school. She attended Boston University.

Post skating career 
Since ending her competitive skating career, Kwan has maintained her connection to the sport. She works as a choreographer and is the skating director at the East West Skating Palace, in Artesia, California. The Kwan family owns and operates the rink.

Kwan graduated from Boston University in 2000 with a bachelor's degree in communications. She worked with clothing designer Vera Wang, who is noted for designing figure skating costumes for Olympians Nancy Kerrigan, Michelle Kwan, Evan Lysacek and Nathan Chen

Personal life 
Kwan was married to three-time U.S. pair skating champion and 1988 Olympic bronze medallist Peter Oppegard. They have two daughters. 

As of 2017, they are estranged. Divorced in 2022.

Results

References

External links

American female single skaters
Sportspeople from Los Angeles County, California
1978 births
Living people
American sportspeople of Chinese descent
American sportswomen of Chinese descent
Boston University College of Communication alumni
People from Artesia, California
Sportspeople from Torrance, California
21st-century American women